Repugnant was a Swedish death metal band from Stockholm active from 1998 to 2004. The band has been cited as one of the first revivalists of the Swedish death metal movement, along with Kaamos. They recorded their only studio album Epitome of Darkness in 2002, but it was left unreleased when the band broke up in 2004, only being published in 2006. Vocalist and guitarist Mary Goore (real name Tobias Forge) recruited a new lineup of Repugnant to perform at the Hell's Pleasure festival in 2010, as well as several other shows, ending at the Maryland Deathfest in the United States on 29 May 2011. 

When Tobias Forge (Goore) received the 2019 Platinagitarren award from STIM for his musical accomplishments, jury member and journalist Ika Johannesson stated that "Old school death metal has rarely sounded as good as Repugnant." According to Swedish Death Metal author Daniel Ekeroth, Repugnant's "amazingly old school-sounding death metal is something you must hear to believe."

Discography 
Spawn of Pure Malevolence (Demo, 1999)
Hecatomb (EP, 1999)
Draped in Cerecloth (Demo, 2001)
Dunkel Besatthet (Split, 2002)
Premature Burial (EP, 2004)
Kaamos / Repugnant (Split, 2004)
Epitome of Darkness (2006)

References 
Footnotes

Works cited

External links 
Repugnant on Myspace

Musical groups established in 1998
Musical groups disestablished in 2004
Musical groups reestablished in 2010
Swedish death metal musical groups
Musical groups from Stockholm